Rodney Chester (born 1965) is an American actor. He is best known for his role as Alex Kirby on the Logo sitcom Noah's Arc.

Biography
Originally from Cocoa, Florida, Chester graduated from Cocoa High School in 1983 and Bethune-Cookman College with honors before moving to Los Angeles to pursue dancing, choreography and theater. He has worked with notable performers, including Whitney Houston, Diana Ross, and Prince.

He later met Noah's Arc creator Patrik-Ian Polk, which led to his acting debut in the independent film Punks, also directed by Polk. While Polk was working on Noah's Arc, he called Chester, specifying that he had a role available for him.

In his personal life, Chester continues to dance and runs a talent agency in Beverly Hills.

Filmography

References

External links
 

Living people
People from Cocoa Beach, Florida
African-American male actors
American male television actors
Bethune–Cookman University alumni
Male actors from Florida
1965 births
21st-century African-American people
20th-century African-American people